The Kiiminki Church is an evangelical Lutheran church in the Kiiminki district of the Finnish city of Oulu.  It was part of the town of Kiiminki until 2013 when that town was merged into Oulu.

The church building has been designed and constructed by Matti Honka, an Ostrobothnian builder of churches in the 18th century. Kiiminki Church is typical for Honka as it is a cruciform church with its corners chamfered. The church was completed in 1760 and inaugurated on July 26, 1761. The wall behind altar has been painted by Mikael Toppelius in 1780s. Bell tower of the church has been built in 1777. Kiiminki Church is one of the best preserved 18th century wooden churches in Finland.

References

External links 

Lutheran churches in Oulu
Churches completed in 1760
Wooden churches in Finland
Church